The Westphalian system, also known as Westphalian sovereignty, is a principle in international law that each state has exclusive sovereignty over its territory. The principle underlies the modern international system of sovereign states and is enshrined in the United Nations Charter, which states that "nothing ... shall authorize the United Nations to intervene in matters which are essentially within the domestic jurisdiction of any state."

According to the principle, every state, no matter how large or small, has an equal right to sovereignty. Political scientists have traced the concept to the Peace of Westphalia (1648), which ended the Thirty Years' War (1618–1648) and Eighty Years' War (1568–1648). The principle of non-interference was further developed in the 18th century. The Westphalian system reached its peak in the 19th and 20th centuries, but it has faced recent challenges from advocates of humanitarian intervention. Efforts to curtail absolute sovereignty have met with substantial resistance by sovereigntist movements in multiple countries who seek to "take back control" from such transnational governance groups and agreements, restoring the world to pre World War II norms of sovereignty.

Principles and criticism 
A series of treaties made up the Peace of Westphalia, which has been considered by political scientists to be the beginning of the modern international system, in which external powers should avoid interfering in another country's domestic affairs. The backdrop of this was the previously held idea that Europe was supposed to be under the umbrella of a single Christian protectorate or empire; governed spiritually by the Pope, and temporally by one rightful emperor, such as that of the Holy Roman Empire. The then-emerging Reformation had undermined this as Protestant-controlled states were less willing to respect the "supra authority" of both the Catholic Church and the Catholic Habsburg-led Emperor.

Recent scholarship has argued that the titular Westphalian treaties in 1648 actually had little to do with the principles with which they are often associated: sovereignty, non-intervention, and the legal equality of states. For example, Andreas Osiander writes that "the treaties confirm neither [France's or Sweden's] 'sovereignty' nor anybody else's; least of all do they contain anything about sovereignty as a principle." Political scientists like Hall Gardner have challenged the titular applicability of these historical treaties towards the political principle on such grounds as well. Others, such as Christoph Kampann and Johannes Paulmann, argue that the 1648 treaties, in fact, limited the sovereignty of numerous states within the Holy Roman Empire and that the Westphalian treaties did not present a coherent new state-system, although they were part of an ongoing change. Yet others, often post-colonialist scholars, point out the limited relevance of the 1648 system to the histories and state systems in the non-Western world. Nonetheless, "Westphalian sovereignty" continues to be used as a shorthand for the basic legal principles underlying the modern state system. The applicability and relevance of these principles have been questioned since the mid-20th century onward from a variety of viewpoints. Much of the debate has turned on the ideas of internationalism and globalization, which some say conflicts with the Doctrine of the two swords ideal of self-sovereignty.

History 

The origins of Westphalian sovereignty have been traced in the scholarly literature to the Peace of Westphalia (1648). The peace treaties put an end to the Thirty Years' War, a war of religion that devastated Germany and killed 30% of its population. Since neither the Catholics nor the Protestants had won a clear victory, the peace settlement established a status quo order in which states would refrain from interfering in each other's religious practices. Henry Kissinger wrote:

The principle of non-interference in other countries' domestic affairs was laid out in the mid-18th century by Swiss jurist Emer de Vattel. States became the primary institutional agents in an interstate system of relations. The Peace of Westphalia is said to have ended attempts to impose supranational authority on European states. The "Westphalian" doctrine of states as independent agents was bolstered by the rise in 19th-century thoughts of 'classical' nationalism, under which legitimate states were assumed to correspond to nations—groups of people united by language and culture. 

Before the Westphalian system, the closest geopolitical system was the "Chanyuan system" established in East Asia in 1005 through the Treaty of Chanyuan, which, like the Westphalian peace treaties, designated national borders between the states of the Song and Liao dynasties in 11th century China. This system was thereafter copied and further developed in East Asia in the following centuries until the establishment of the pan-Eurasian Mongol Empire in the 13th century.

The Westphalian system reached its peak in the late 19th century. Although practical considerations still led powerful states to seek to influence the affairs of others, forcible intervention by one country in the domestic affairs of another was less frequent between 1850 and 1900 than in most previous and subsequent periods (i.e. Napoleonic, the Great War, the Second World War).

After the end of the Cold War, United States and Western Europe began talking of a post-Westphalian order in which countries could intervene against other countries under the context of human rights abuses. Critics of the post-Westphalian policy have argued that such intervention would be and has been used to continue processes similar to standard Euro-American colonialism, and that the colonial powers always used ideas similar to "humanitarian intervention" to justify colonialism, slavery, and similar practices. China and Russia have used their United Nations Security Council veto power to block what they see as American attempts to violate the sovereignty of other nations, perceiving it as imperialistic expansion under the guise of humanitarian intervention.

Challenges to Westphalia 
The end of the Cold War saw increased international integration and, arguably, the erosion of Westphalian sovereignty. Much of the literature was primarily concerned with criticizing realist models of international politics in which the  notion of the state as a unitary agent is taken as axiomatic.

In 1998, at a Symposium on the Continuing Political Relevance of the Peace of Westphalia, NATO Secretary-General Javier Solana said that "humanity and democracy [were] two principles essentially irrelevant to the original Westphalian order" and levelled a criticism that "the Westphalian system had its limits. For one, the principle of sovereignty it relied on also produced the basis for rivalry, not community of states; exclusion, not integration."

In 1999, British Prime Minister Tony Blair gave a speech in Chicago where he "set out a new, post-Westphalian, 'doctrine of the international community. Blair argued that globalization had made the Westphalian approach anachronistic. Blair was later referred to by The Daily Telegraph as "the man who ushered in the post-Westphalian era". Others have also asserted that globalization has superseded the Westphalian system.

In 2000, Germany's Foreign Minister Joschka Fischer referred to the Peace of Westphalia in his Humboldt Speech, which argued that the system of European politics set up by Westphalia was obsolete: "The core of the concept of Europe after 1945 was and still is a rejection of the European balance-of-power principle and the hegemonic ambitions of individual states that had emerged following the Peace of Westphalia in 1648, a rejection which took the form of closer meshing of vital interests and the transfer of nation-state sovereign rights to supranational European institutions."

The European Union's concept of shared sovereignty is also somewhat contrary to historical views of Westphalian sovereignty, as it provides for external agents to influence and interfere in the internal affairs of its member countries. In a 2008 article Phil Williams links the rise of terrorism and violent non-state actors (VNSAs), which pose a threat to the Westphalian sovereignty of the state, to globalization.

Military intervention 
Interventions such as in Cambodia by Vietnam (the Cambodian–Vietnamese War) or in Bangladesh (then a part of Pakistan) by India (the Bangladesh Liberation War and the Indo-Pakistani War of 1971) were seen by some as examples of humanitarian intervention, although their basis in international law is debatable. Other more recent interventions, and their attendant infringements of state sovereignty, also have prompted debates about their legality and motivations.

A new notion of contingent sovereignty seems to be emerging, but it has not yet reached the point of international legitimacy. Neoconservatism in particular has developed this line of thinking further, asserting that a lack of democracy may foreshadow future humanitarian crises, or that democracy itself constitutes a human right, and therefore states not respecting democratic principles open themselves up to just war by other countries. However, proponents of this theory have been accused of being concerned about democracy, human rights and humanitarian crises only in countries where American global dominance is challenged, while ignoring the same issues in other countries friendlier to the United States.

Further criticism of Westphalian sovereignty arises regarding allegedly failed states, of which Afghanistan (before the 2001 US-led invasion) is often considered an example. By this view, it has been argued that no sovereignty exists and that international intervention is justified on humanitarian grounds and by the threats posed by failed states to neighboring countries and the world as a whole.

Defenders of Westphalia 

Although the Westphalian system developed in early modern Europe, its staunchest defenders can now be found in the non-Western world. The presidents of China and Russia issued a joint statement in 2001 vowing to "counter attempts to undermine the fundamental norms of the international law with the help of concepts such as 'humanitarian intervention' and 'limited sovereignty. China and Russia have used their United Nations Security Council veto power to block what they see as American violations of state sovereignty in Syria. Russia was left out of the original Westphalian system in 1648, but post-Soviet Russia has seen Westphalian sovereignty as a means to balance American power by encouraging a multipolar world order.

Some in the West also speak favourably of the Westphalian state. American political scientist Stephen Walt urged U.S. President Donald Trump to return to Westphalian principles, calling it a "sensible course" for American foreign policy.

See also 

 Civic nationalism
 Monopoly on violence
 Precedence among European monarchies
 Westfailure

References

Further reading 
 John Agnew, Globalization and Sovereignty (2009)
 T. Biersteker and C. Weber (eds.), State Sovereignty as Social Construct (1996)
 Wendy Brown, Walled States, Waning Sovereignty (2010)
 Hedley Bull, The Anarchical Society (1977)
 Joseph Camilleri and Jim Falk, The End of Sovereignty?: The Politics of a Shrinking and Fragmenting World, Edward Elgar, Aldershot (1992)
 Derek Croxton, "The Peace of Westphalia of 1648 and the Origins of Sovereignty," The International History Review vol. 21 (1999)
 A. Claire Cutler, "Critical Reflections on the Westphalian Assumptions of International Law and Organization," Review of International Studies vol. 27 (2001)
 M. Fowler and J. Bunck, Law, Power, and the Sovereign State (1995)
 S. H. Hashmi (ed.), State Sovereignty: Change and Persistence in International Relations (1997)
 F. H. Hinsley, Sovereignty (1986)
 K. J. Holsti, Taming the Sovereigns (2004)
 Robert Jackson, The Global Covenant (2000)
 Henry Kissinger, World Order (2014)
 Stephen Krasner, Sovereignty: Organized Hypocrisy (1999)
 Stephen Krasner (ed.), Problematic Sovereignty (2001)
 J.H. Leurdijk, Intervention in International Politics, Eisma BV, Leeuwarden, Netherlands (1986)
 Andreas Osiander, "Sovereignty, International Relations, and the Westphalian Myth," International Organization vol. 55 (2001)
 Daniel Philpott, Revolutions in Sovereignty (2001)
 Cormac Shine, 'Treaties and Turning Points: The Thirty Years' War', History Today (2016)
 Hendrik Spruyt, The Sovereign State and Its Competitors (1994)
 Phil Williams, Violent Non-State Actors and National and International Security, ISN, 2008
 Wael Hallaq, "The Impossible State: Islam, Politics, and Modernity's Moral Predicament" (2012)

1648 in international relations
Political terminology
Sovereignty
Early Modern history of Germany
Legal history of the Dutch Republic
1648 in Europe
History of diplomacy
Western culture